"Wine It Up" is a Portuguese-language and English-language song by Lucenzo and Sean Paul, written by Lucenzo and Sean Paul and produced by Lucenzo. It was released on the July 9, 2012 by Yanis Records. The song has charted in France.

Track listing
 Digital download
 "Wine It Up" (featuring Sean Paul) [Radio Edit] – 3:26

Credits and personnel
Lead vocals – Lucenzo and Sean Paul
Producers – Lucenzo
Lyrics – Lucenzo, Sean Paul
Label: Yanis Records, Universal Music

Chart performance

Release history

References

Notes
 Wine It Up (Single) - Lucenzo Ft. Sean Paul Universal Music
 http://artists.letssingit.com/lucenzo-lyrics-wine-it-up-9hdgwc5
 http://www.nrj.fr/actus-3965/actu-music-524/article/287674-lucenzo-et-sean-paul-se-retrouvent-sur-wine-it-up-.html NRJ
 http://www.activradio.com/info/musique/Lucenzo-Wine-It-Up-feat.-Sean-Paul-430.html
 http://www.buzzraider.fr/2012/07/lucenzo-feat-sean-paul-wine-it-up/
 http://www.justmusic.fr/actualites/wine-it-up-le-nouveau-tube-de-lucenzo-13536
 http://www.funradio.fr/article/funradio/7750571627/ecoutez-le-nouveau-lucenzo-feat-sean-paul-wine-it-up Fun Radio (France)
 http://www.chartsinfrance.net/Lucenzo/news-80711.html

External links
 Lucenzo's Official Website
 

2012 singles
Sean Paul songs
Lucenzo songs
Songs written by Sean Paul
Songs written by Lucenzo